Tenancingo is a municipality in the Cuscatlán department of El Salvador.

Geography
(Approximately  of that road are gravel).

History
The date of first settlement is uncertain. Numerous indigenous artifacts have been found that indicate that the site of the present Tenancingo was populated by Pipil Native Americans in Pre-Columbian times.

Municipalities of the Cuscatlán Department